Diamecyna setifera is a species of beetle in the family Cerambycidae, and the only species in the genus Diamecyna. It was described by Stephan von Breuning in 1939.

Its type locality is Sumatra.

References

Apomecynini
Beetles described in 1939
Taxa named by Stephan von Breuning (entomologist)
Monotypic Cerambycidae genera